Nicholas "Nick" Virachkul (June 3, 1948 – April 17, 1999) was an American professional darts player who competed in the 1970s and 1980s.

Personal life
Nicky Virachkul was born in Thailand, studied in the United States and became a naturalized citizen.

Darts career
Virachkul represented the United States internationally in dart tournaments.

He competed at the first Embassy World Darts Championship in 1978, losing narrowly by 7–8 in the semi-final to eventual champion, Leighton Rees. He won third place in a play-off by defeating Stefan Lord. Virachakul reached the quarter-finals on three other occasions: in 1981 (losing to Eric Bristow), 1982 (losing to Bobby George) and 1984 (losing to Dave Whitcombe). Despite his respectable record, it was nevertheless a surprise when he defeated the defending World Champion, Keith Deller, in the first round of the 1984 World Championship. Deller had his revenge in the first round the following year. The 1985 championship was Virachkul's last appearance in the final stages. Despite competing in the first eight World Championships, he never again qualified after the tournament moved to the Lakeside Country Club in 1986.

Virachkul competed in the third WDF World Cup darts tournament in 1979 and won the singles title. In 1980 he reached the semi-finals of the Winmau World Masters. He also won the 1978 Windy City Open, the 1982 North American Open and the 1983 Dallas Open.

Nicky Virachkul was inducted into the National Darts Hall of Fame in 1996.

Death
Suffering from cancer, Virachkul died in 1999 at the age of 50.

World Championship Results

BDO

 1978: 3rd Place (beat Stefan Lord 4–5) (legs)
 1979: 2nd Round (lost to Alan Glazier 1–2) (sets)
 1980: 2nd Round (lost to Bill Lennard 0–2)
 1981: Quarter Finals (lost to Eric Bristow 0–4)
 1982: Quarter Finals (lost to Bobby George 1–4)
 1983: 1st Round (lost to Keith Deller 1–2)
 1984: Quarter Finals (lost to Dave Whitcombe 0–5)
 1985: 1st Round (lost to Keith Deller 0–2)

Career finals

WDF major finals: 1 (1 title)

References

External links
Details of death
Nicky Virachkul's profile and stats on Darts Database

1948 births
1999 deaths
American darts players
British Darts Organisation players
Thai emigrants to the United States